Minky Worden is an American human rights advocate and author. She serves as Director of Global Initiatives at Human Rights Watch. She has been an adjunct associate professor at Columbia University’s School of International and Public Affairs since 2013.

Early life and education 
A native of Tennessee, Worden is a graduate of Vanderbilt University where she majored in Political Science, German and History. She speaks Cantonese and German.

Career 
Worden joined Human Rights Watch in 1998. As its Director of Global Initiatives, she develops and implements international outreach and advocacy campaigns. She previously served as Human Rights Watch's Media Director, working with the world’s journalists to help them cover crises, wars, human rights abuses and political developments in some 90 countries worldwide. Worden speaks and writes extensively on the topics of political prisoners, women’s rights, and human rights and sports.

She previously lived and worked in Hong Kong as an adviser to Democratic Party of Hong Kong chairman Martin Lee and worked at the U.S. Department of Justice in Washington, D.C., as a speechwriter for U.S. Attorney General Dick Thornburgh and in the Executive Office for U.S. Attorneys.

Worden is editor of China's Great Leap: The Beijing Games and Olympian Human Rights Challenges (Seven Stories Press, 2008) and The Unfinished Revolution: Voices from the Global Fight for Women's Rights (Seven Stories Press, 2012). She was co-editor with Kenneth Roth and Amy Bernstein of Torture: Does It Make Us Safer? Is It Ever OK?: A Human Rights Perspective (The New Press, 2005).

Books 
 The Unfinished Revolution: Voices from the Global Fight for Women's Rights (Seven Stories Press, 2012)
 Foreword by Christiane Amanpour. This book outlines the global challenge to secure basic rights for women and girls. Writers from around the world tackle some of the toughest questions about improving the lives of women, and explain why we need fresh approaches for the most vexing and durable abuses.
 China's Great Leap: The Beijing Games and Olympian Human Rights Challenges (Seven Stories Press, 2008)
 Foreword by Nicholas Kristof. China's Great Leap examines three decades of reform in the People's Republic of China in the context of the 2008 Olympic Games. With contributions from Nobel Peace Prize Laureate Liu Xiaobo and other reformists, the book spotlights key areas for human rights reform that could represent a possible great leap forward for the people of China.
 Torture (The New Press, 2005)
 The question of cruel and unusual treatment has taken on new urgency in the United States and around the world. Torture features twelve essays by leading thinkers and experts ranging over history and continents, offering a nuanced, up-to-the-minute exploration of this wrenching topic.

Writings 
Worden has written dozens of articles for news outlets, including:
 "Saudi Sports Reforms Give Girls in the Kingdom a Running Start." The New York Times. September 7, 2017.
 "She Conquered Everest: Now She's Tackling Laws That Keep Women Out of Sport." CNN. May 11, 2017.
 "Beach Volleyball and Women's Rights in Iran?" CNN. February 4, 2016.
 "Human Rights and the 2022 Olympics". The New York Times. January 19, 2015.
 "Raising the Bar: Mega-Sporting Events and Human Rights". Human Rights Watch World Report 2015.
 "Minky Worden: Russia's Anti-Gay Laws Threaten the Olympics' Character". The Washington Post. November 22, 2013.
 "The Olympics’ Leadership Mess". The New York Times. August 8, 2013.
 "In Saudi Arabia, Women Are Confined by Technology". The Washington Post. December 24, 2012.
 "The View From the Empire State Building". MSNBC. October 20, 2003.
 "Hong Kong's Brave Struggle for Democracy." The Asian Wall Street Journal. July 2, 1998.

Boards of directors 
 The Overseas Press Club, elected Associate Board of Governors Member (since 1999)
 Asia Catalyst, Board Member (since 2009)
 The International Campaign for Human Rights in Iran, Board Chair (since 2010)
 Platon’s The People’s Portfolio, Board Chair (since 2013)
 The Human Trafficking Legal Center, Board (since 2014)

Memberships and affiliations 
 Council on Foreign Relations, Member (since 1999)
 Council on Foreign Relations, Term Member Advisory Committee (1999-2004)
 Seven Stories Press, Advisory Board Member

Personal life 
Worden is married to L. Gordon Crovitz, a media executive and advisor to media and technology companies who is a former publisher of The Wall Street Journal. They have three sons. 

At age 50, she completed her first Olympic triathlon.

References

American human rights activists
Women human rights activists
Human Rights Watch people
Living people
Year of birth missing (living people)